David Joseph Attard (29 March 1953) is a Maltese advocate, judge-barrister, member of the Middle Temple England and Wales and academic professor. He was pro-chancellor University of Malta in 2006 and chancellor since 2011.

Attard was born in Sliema, Malta, he is a graduate of University of Malta in diploma of notary public, LLD University of Malta DPHIL  University of Oxford.

Professional experience 
He is experienced law teacher of the sea, associated professor in Law at the Malta University and became professor in International public law both in Malta University in 1988, he was head UNEP environmental diplomacy Mediterranean in academy of diplomatic studies, director IMO international maritime law institute, visiting professor of International Law, University of Rome Tor Vergata in 1994, senior visiting lecturer in College of Foreign Affairs, Beijing, research fellow at University of Oxford in 1998, scholar in Yale Law School and visiting professor at Université de Paris I- Panthéon Sorbonne.

Attard was Chairman of Exploration Committee in the Office of the Prime Minister of Malta in 1988,  Advisor to the Secretary-general International Maritime Organization 1988-89, Special Legal Advisor to the Executive Director of the United Nations Environmental Programme in Nairobi 1989-91 and member of the Steering Committee for Human Rights (CDDH), Council of Europe, Strasbourg.

Merit award 

 Chevalier dans l’Ordre National de la Legion D’Honneur by President of the French Republic
 National Order of Merit by the President of Malta in 2009
 Orden de Isabel la Católica by the King of Spain in 2010.
 Order of Merit of the Italian Republic by the President of Italy.

Book 

 The Exclusive Economic Zone in International Law, Clarendon Press, A.J. David, and was granted the Paul Guggenheim award prize Geneva

Publications 

 David Joseph Attard; Malgosia Fitzmaurice; Norman A Martínez Gutiérrez; IMO International Maritime Law Institute, Notes:"25th anniversary IMLI; supported by the Nippon Foundation
 David Joseph Attard; David M Ong; Malgosia Fitzmaurice; Alexandros XM Ntovas; Dino Kritsiotis, Oxford, United Kingdom: Oxford University Press, 
 David Joseph Attard; Malgosia Fitzmaurice, Publisher: Oxford Oxford University. Press 2014 Series: IMLI manual on international maritime law / Ed. David Joseph Attard, vol-1.

Notes 

1953 births
Yale Law School alumni
Alumni of the University of Oxford
People from Sliema
University of Malta alumni
Members of the Middle Temple
Living people